The Wilson is a historic Renaissance Revival apartment building located at 643 Fort Wayne Avenue in Indianapolis, Indiana, United States.  It was built in 1905 amid an apartment-building boom; more than fifty such apartment buildings were completed in what is now central Indianapolis in 1905 alone.

In 1983, the Wilson was listed on the National Register of Historic Places as part of the "Apartments and Flats of Downtown Indianapolis" multiple property submission.  The apartments in this group were added to the Register for their architecture and for their place in the development of commerce and real estate development in Indianapolis.

Its NRHP nomination states:  "The Wilson is significant for its use of numerous distinctive Renaissance Revival motifs derived from the classical vocabulary of architectural design." It has a five bay Doric order terra cotta entrance arcade and other architectural details.

References

External links

Apartment buildings in Indiana
Residential buildings on the National Register of Historic Places in Indiana
Renaissance Revival architecture in Indiana
Residential buildings completed in 1905
Residential buildings in Indianapolis
National Register of Historic Places in Indianapolis
1905 establishments in Indiana